Aples G. Tecuari (born 21 April 1973) is an Indonesian footballer who previously played as a defender for PSPS Pekanbaru and the Indonesia national team.

Clubs career

Club statistics

International career
In 1996 Aples's international career began.

International goals

Honours

International
Indonesia
 AFF Championship runner-up: 2002

References

External links
 

1973 births
Association football defenders
Living people
Indonesian footballers
Indonesia international footballers
Papuan people
Papuan sportspeople
Indonesian Premier Division players
Pelita Jaya FC players
Perseman Manokwari players
Persija Jakarta players
PSPS Pekanbaru players
Sportspeople from Papua